Lin Newborn (May 7, 1974 – July 4, 1998) was an African-American anti-racist skinhead who was murdered by white supremacists in July 1998 alongside his friend, Daniel Shersty.

Description 
Newborn spent much of his adult life campaigning against racism. He specialized in de-programing young, newly recruited Nazi Skinheads, convincing them that they could be a part of a greater family that didn't discriminate against religion, ethnic background or sexual orientation. He taught that love and unity were stronger than hatred. A native of Pomona, California, he lived in Las Vegas, Nevada where he was a member of the Las Vegas Unity Skins and sang in the band Counter Culture (a local Las Vegas punk band) and later in Life of Lies  which ended around 1996. 

On July 4, 1998, white supremacists murdered Newborn at the age of 24 along with his friend, Daniel Shersty. On July 6, 1998, Newborn's body was found three miles west of U.S. Highway 95 near Rome Boulevard, within  of Shersty's body. Police state that the victims were lured by two women, under the pretext of attending a party. Newborn and Shersty were taken to a northwest part of the valley, where they were beaten and possibly tortured before being shot to death. Police speculate that Newborn may have been trying to escape when he was killed.

John "Polar Bear" Butler (then 26), a known neo-Nazi, was convicted of the murders and sentenced to death. He was allegedly the leader of a group called the Independent Nazi Skins. After appealing, Butler's death sentence was vacated and he was given four life terms without parole. He is registered with the Las Vegas Metropolitan Police Department's gang unit as a white supremacist. He is currently housed at High Desert State Prison in Nevada.

Poem 
In a poem dated December 5, 1993, Newborn may have been predicting his own death. Language from the poem mirrors that of a threatening note found in Butler's stolen Jeep, which reads, in part ""'Do you know this punk ass SHARP named Spit [Newborn's moniker]? You pulled a gun on his bitch.'" The letter writer also wanted "this punk Spit to know that he can be reached out and touched."

The poem (which may be titled "Shell" because of the picture of a shell at the top with the word written in it), reads:

Shell    -- IDYLL KYLLJOI SPITX

COME AND TOUCH ME,
GREAT FATHER....
DEATH!
Tis for you I Walk the Edge!
Tis for you I Cross the Line!
Tis for you Ive [sic] DIED Again.
Set me FREE FROM my hell
I don't want to FACE
you!
You are here...
but only for me now!
So now I've died!
Is this my hell?
Is this my hell?
Is this my hell?
The Fucking Angels ARE gone
I'm slane [sic] again
There's nothing here 
Except
my shell, my shell, my shell
is sold to you Again
my shell is yours again,
touch me, but only to 
SET ME FREE!
I can't be slane [sic] anymore!
I can't be yours anymore!

References

External links
Las Vegas Review-Journal: Butler sentenced to die for slayings
Racist Skinheads - Nazi Skinhead gets death in murder of antiracists
Obituary
RIP Spit and Dan - Las Vegas City Life commentary
Orlando Weekly Article

American anti-racism activists
Assassinated American activists
1974 births
1998 deaths
People murdered in Nevada
Deaths by firearm in Nevada
People from Pomona, California